The Namaquab barb (Pseudobarbus hospes) is a species of cyprinid fish.

It is found in Namibia and South Africa. River regulation in the Orange River system may have benefited this species.

References

Pseudobarbus
Cyprinid fish of Africa
Fish described in 1938
Taxonomy articles created by Polbot
Taxobox binomials not recognized by IUCN